Coffee Town is a 2013 American comedy film written and directed by Brad Copeland. The first feature film from CollegeHumor, it was released on July 9, 2013 on digital platforms and in select theatrical engagements, leading up to a festival premiere on July 27, 2013 at Just For Laughs in Montreal.

Plot
Will is a website manager for an electronics company who uses his local coffee house, Coffee Town, as his own personal office. When the corporate owners of the shop have plans to convert the coffee house into a modern Coffee Town and Bistro, Will enlists the help of his two best friends – lighting salesman Chad and local police officer Gino – to save his office. In order to thwart the plans of Coffee Town's corporate owners, the trio plan to stage a robbery, creating the illusion of a crime-riddled neighborhood that is not suitable for a bistro. However, standing in Will's way is Sam, a disgruntled barista with big dreams of being a rock star. Meanwhile, Will tries his best to court his coffee house crush Becca, an ER trauma nurse.

Cast
Glenn Howerton as Will
Steve Little as Chad
Ben Schwartz as Gino
Adrianne Palicki as Becca
Josh Groban as Sam
Derek Waters as Will's former roommate
Josh Perry as Toby, a man with Down Syndrome
Matt Riedy as Mr. Ryan, Chad's boss
Taika Waititi as Cosmetology Instructor (Uncredited)

References

External links

Coffee Town Official Website 
Coffee Town Official Trailer 

2013 comedy films
2013 films
CollegeHumor
American comedy films
Films with screenplays by Brad Copeland
2013 directorial debut films
2010s English-language films
2010s American films